Greg John Taylor (born 5 November 1997) is a Scottish professional footballer who plays as a left-back for Celtic and the Scotland national team.

Club career

Early years
He started his career as a youth player at Rangers and was associated with the Ibrox club for six years until he was released, with the club saying he was "too small and too slight." He then signed for Kilmarnock in July 2014, and captained their under-17 and under-20 youth teams before making his progression into first team football in 2016.

Kilmarnock
Taylor made his first team debut for Kilmarnock on 14 May 2016, starting at left back in a Scottish Premiership game against Dundee United. He then made his second start in the second leg of the Scottish Premiership Play-off Final, which Kilmarnock won 4–0 against Falkirk to win the tie 4–1 on aggregate. After the 2015–16 season ended, Taylor signed a three-year contract with Kilmarnock.

Having kept his place in the team under managers Lee Clark, Lee McCulloch and Steve Clarke (the latter of whom oversaw a dramatic improvement in the club's form during 2017–18), Taylor was rewarded with another new contract in April 2018, running until June 2021. Taylor scored his first goal for the club, the first in a 5–0 win against Hamilton Accies on 30 March 2019.

During the summer 2019 transfer window, Kilmarnock rejected offers for Taylor from Nürnberg, Sunderland and Celtic.

Celtic
Taylor signed a four-year contract with Celtic on 2 September 2019. He made his debut for the club against St Mirren at Celtic Park in a 2-0 home win in the Scottish Premiership on 30 October 2019.

On 18 August 2020, Taylor scored his first goal for Celtic in a UEFA Champions League qualifying match against KR Reykjavík in a 6-0 victory.

On 20th December 2020, Taylor featured as a starter for Celtic in the delayed 2019–20 Scottish Cup final against Scottish Championship side Heart of Midlothian. In a dramatic match which seen both sides draw each other 3-3 after extra-time, Celtic won on penalties and lifted their 12th successive domestic honour as part of an unprecedented quadruple treble. This would also see Taylor collect his first Scottish Cup winners' medal and his second honour with Celtic.

During the 2021–22 Scottish Premiership season, Taylor established himself as an integral part of Celtic's team under manager Ange Postecoglou and was awarded a long-term contract extension running until 2025.

On 19th December 2021, Taylor started for Celtic in the 2021–22 Scottish League Cup final against Hibernian and went on to collect another cup winners' medal, largely thanks to a brace from Kyogo Furuhashi which sealed a 2-1 victory and ultimately the Scottish League Cup for Celtic that season.

On 6 September 2022, Taylor played in his first UEFA Champions League group stage match in a 3-0 home defeat against Real Madrid.

On 22 October 2022, Taylor scored the winning goal in a 4-3 victory against Heart of Midlothian at Tynecastle Park in the Scottish Premiership.

International career
In March 2017, Taylor played in his first match for the Scotland under-21 side  in a friendly against Estonia.

Selected for the Scotland under-20 squad in the 2017 Toulon Tournament.  In the second match, Taylor scored the only goal in a 1–0 win against Brazil U20,  which was the nations first ever win against Brazil at any level. The team went on to claim the bronze medal. It was the nations first ever medal at the competition. Taylor was also the only Scottish player named in the 'team of the tournament', as well as being named 4th best player.

Selected for the U21 squad in the 2018 Toulon Tournament, the team lost to Turkey under-21s in a penalty-out and finished fourth.

Taylor was named in the full Scotland squad for UEFA Euro 2020 qualifying fixtures in June 2019; he remained on the bench in the home game against Cyprus at Hampden Park. After captain Andy Robertson picked up an injury, Taylor debuted at left-back against the world's top-ranked team, Belgium on 11 June, and played the full match in Brussels as Scotland lost 3–0. Manager Steve Clarke hailed Taylor's debut as "excellent".

He then played in the next two games, on 16 and 19 November, winning against Kazakhstan and Cyprus. His performances were praised especially for his link up play with left sided Celtic team mate, James Forrest.

Personal life
Taylor was born in Greenock and raised in nearby Gourock, attending Clydeview Academy. His younger brother Ally plays for Alloa Athletic, and made his first team debut in February 2020 while Greg was playing for their opponents Celtic.

Career statistics

Honours

Celtic
 Scottish Premiership: 2019–20, 2021–22
Scottish Cup: 2019–20
Scottish League Cup: 2021–22 2022–23
Individual
Toulon Tournament Best XI: 2017

References

External links

1997 births
Living people
Footballers from Greenock
People from Gourock
Scottish footballers
Scotland youth international footballers
Scotland under-21 international footballers
Scotland international footballers
Association football defenders
Kilmarnock F.C. players
Celtic F.C. players
Scottish Professional Football League players
UEFA Euro 2020 players